Maelrhys is honoured as a saint on Bardsey Island in Wales.  Maelrhys was likely of Breton origin but little else is known of him beyond popular cult and local records.

Saint Maelrhys is commemorated on 1 January by the Church in Wales, Western Rite Orthodox communities, and the Roman Catholic Church.

See also

Brittany
Breton language
Welsh language

References

Christian saints in unknown century
Welsh Roman Catholic saints
Medieval Welsh saints
Year of birth unknown